The Bulgarian capital of Sofia suffered a series of Allied bombing raids during World War II, from mid 1941 to early 1944. Bulgaria declared war on the United Kingdom and the United States on 13 December 1941. The Southern Italy-based Allied air forces extended the range of their strategic operations to include Bulgaria and other Axis allies in 1943.

Raids

April 1941 
During the invasions of Yugoslavia and of Greece, the Yugoslav and British air forces targeted strategic points in Bulgaria, from which German troops had staged the invasions.

On 6 April, Yugoslav Dornier Do 17 aircraft bombed the industrial section of Sofia and Kyustendil. In Sofia, eight people were killed. In the bombing of Kyustendil 58 civilians, two Bulgarian and eight German soldiers were killed and 59 civilians, five Bulgarian and 31 German soldiers were wounded.

Between 20:05 and 21:40 on 6 April, the Royal Air Force (RAF) carried out bombing raids over Bulgaria. Bristol Blenheim aircraft bombed Petrich and Haskovo and six Vickers Wellington bombers dropped bombs over Sofia and nearby villages. During the bombing of the capital, 14 buildings were destroyed and three fires were started. Sofia was bombed a second time on 13 April, provoking a large exodus.

14 November 1943 
The air raid was carried out on 14 November 1943 by 91 B-25 Mitchell bombers. Forty-seven buildings and structures were destroyed, 59 military personnel were killed and over 128 were injured.

24 November 1943 
A new bombing followed on 24 November, this time executed by 60 B-24 Liberator aircraft. 87 buildings in the vicinity of the Central Railway Station were destroyed with 29 being wounded. Bulgarian fighters shot down two bombers for the loss of one aircraft to escorting American fighters.

10 December 1943 
The 10 December raid was carried out by 120 aircraft. About 90 bombs were released over the Hadzhi Dimitar, Industrialen, Malashevtsi and Voenna rampa quarters, another 90 hit Vrazhdebna Airport and the nearby villages.

20 December 1943 
One of the most destructive raids followed on 20 December, with over 113 buildings being razed to the ground, the belt line being cut off, with 93 people injured. Bulgarian fighter aircraft downed three bombers and seven fighters for the loss of two aircraft, including one destroyed in a suicidal ramming attack by Dimitar Spisarevski which brought down a bomber.

30 December 1943 
A day bombing in the Sofia railway junction area was executed on 30 December 1943, injuring 96.

10 January 1944 
Sofia suffered another bombing on 10 January 1944, carried out consecutively by 143 American B-17s during the day and 44 RAF Wellingtons (during the night). 448 buildings were destroyed. 611 were wounded. During the daylight raid by the B-17s, Bulgarian fighters shot down six of the bombers and three escorting P-38 fighters for the loss of one aircraft.

16 March 1944 
During the night 50 British bombers attacked Sofia. 58 people were wounded and 72 buildings were destroyed.

24 March 1944 
During the night about 40 British bombers attacked Sofia. There were no casualties.

30 March 1944 
The most severe bombing of Sofia ever occurred on 30 March 1944. Some 450 American and British heavy bombers escorted by 150 fighters attacked the city center of Sofia, destroying 3575 buildings. Over 3000 high explosive bombs and 30000 incendiary bombs were used. Bulgarian fighter aircraft intercepted the attackers, shooting down eight bombers and two fighters for no losses in return. The casualty figures were relatively modest due to preliminary evacuation of the civilians. The targets of the bombing were neither military installations, nor armed forces, but historical central Sofia.

17 April 1944 
This bombing is known as "the black Easter" (the second day of Easter) for the citizens of Sofia. The raid was carried out by 350 bombers (B-17 and B-24) with an escort of 100 fighter planes –Mustangs and Lightnings. About 2500 bombs were dropped over the target – railroad marshaling yards. 749 buildings were totally destroyed. Casualties were 69 people wounded.

Consequences 

The bombing raids in 1943–1944 resulted in 1,743 being injured. The number of buildings damaged were 12,564 (of which 2,670 completely destroyed). Sixty motor cars and 55 trailers were also destroyed. The Allies lost a total of 117 aircraft.

Among the historic buildings destroyed were several schools and hotels, as well as the State Printing House, the Regional Court, the Small Baths and the National Library. These were not restored to their original appearance. The Bulgarian National Theatre, the Bulgarian Agricultural Bank, the Theological Faculty of Sofia University, the Museum of Natural History, the Bulgarian Academy of Sciences and other buildings were damaged but subsequently reconstructed.

 (1915–1944) was a German Luftwaffe pilot (kommandeur I/JG 5) who was killed in the sky over Radomir, while defending Sofia. He was the only foreign pilot killed in battle while defending Bulgarian airspace during World War II. He was part of the Jagdgeschwader 5 "Eismeer" fighter wing.

Destructions

See also 
 Military history of Bulgaria during World War II
 History of Sofia

References

External links 
 Sofia in the year of 1944, after the American and British bombardment

Sofia
Military history of Bulgaria during World War II
Bulgaria–United Kingdom military relations
Bulgaria–United States military relations
20th century in Sofia
1943 in Bulgaria
1944 in Bulgaria
History of Sofia
Events in Sofia